James John Murphy McDonogh (13 April 1871 – 26 January 1912) was an Irish first-class cricketer.

McDonogh was born at Killarney in County Kerry in April 1871. His debut in first-class cricket came in New Zealand for the North Island against a touring New South Wales team at Wellington in February 1894. His next appearances in first-class cricket came nearly a decade later in British India, when he played two matches for the Europeans against the Parsees in 1903. Emigrating to the United States, McDonogh later played three first-class matches for the Gentlemen of Philadelphia against Jamaica during their 1908–09 tour of Jamaica. Across six first-class matches, McDonogh scored 203 runs at an average of 18.45, with a highest score of 86. This score, one of two half-centuries he made, came for the Gentlemen of Philadelphia against Jamaica. With the ball, he took 10 wickets at a bowling average of 25.70, with best innings figures of 4/53. He died at Philadelphia in January 1912.

References

External links

1871 births
1912 deaths
People from Killarney
Irish cricketers
North Island cricketers
Europeans cricketers
Irish emigrants to the United States (before 1923)
Philadelphian cricketers
Sportspeople from County Kerry